Brian Stephen Corsetti is an American car builder and television personality.

Early and personal life 
Brian Corsetti grew up in St. Petersburg, Florida and graduated from Hunter College in New York City. While attending college he started his career working for the Ron and Fez radio show at WNEW in New York City (2002–2003). He also appeared on The Opie and Anthony Show in 2003, and later served alongside music producer Matt Serletic at Virgin Records, in New York City and London.

Career 

Brian first got on the scene with The Dew Report, hosting a six episode extreme sports show where he traveled across the country in search for the ultimate extreme sport. He then had his own show on the DIY Network called Garage Mahal where he, along with co-host pro wrestler Bill Goldberg, transform ordinary garages.  Following that, he hosted The Victoria's Secret Fashion Show Behind the Scene Coverage on CBS which won him multiple awards.

In 2010 Brian appeared alongside Alec Baldwin, John O'Hurley, and Robert Kennedy Jr., when he hosted A Celebrity Sports Invitational in Banff, Canada, and one in Jamaica for NBC.  In 2011, he acted as an executive producer, and television host in the FOX Sports show The Great Ride, where he traveled around the US in search of the ultimate motorcycle ride.

Other shows include Hollyscoop on FOX  and "ENTV", an entertainment show, for ION Television, Yahoo, and AOL, and the nationally syndicated show THE LIST.

He won an Emmy for his talent on the E. W. Scripps Company owned show THE LIST in 2016.

In 2017 he won his second Emmy Award as best TV Host in a syndicated series for E. W. Scripps Company

Other Ventures 

In 2018 Jay Leno featured Brian on his show Jay Leno's Garage regarding his Land Cruiser collection. Shortly after Brian launched Corsetti Cruisers in 2019  where he builds classic 4X4's from the ground up. Specifically the Toyota Land Cruiser.

Brian Corsetti operates Corsetti Cruisers out of Gardena, CA

External links 

Instagram
TikTok
Brian Corsetti's Website
Corsetti Cruisers Website

References 

Living people
Radio personalities from New York City
American television hosts
People from St. Petersburg, Florida
American carpenters
Hunter College alumni
Year of birth missing (living people)